The Taifa of Tejada was a medieval Islamic taifa kingdom that existed only from 1146 to 1150 when it was conquered by the Almohad Caliphate. It was centered at the town of Tejada located in the present day Province of Burgos in northern Spain. It was ruled by an Arab family of the Banu Khazraj tribe. They claimed descent from Anas ibn Malik who was a sahaba (companion) of the Islamic prophet Muhammad.

List of Emirs

Khazraj dynasty
Yusuf al-Khazraji (in Niebla 1145–?): 1146–1150

1150 disestablishments in Europe
States and territories established in 1146
Tejada